Els Garidells is a municipality in the comarca of the Alt Camp in Catalonia, Spain. It is situated on the right bank of the Francolí river. A local road links the village with the N-240 road between Valls and Tarragona.
 
Els Garidells became part of the Alt Camp in the comarcal revision of 1990: previously it formed part of the Tarragonès.

References

 Panareda Clopés, Josep Maria; Rios Calvet, Jaume; Rabella Vives, Josep Maria (1989). Guia de Catalunya, Barcelona: Caixa de Catalunya.  (Spanish).  (Catalan).

External links 
  
 Government data pages 

Municipalities in Alt Camp
Populated places in Alt Camp